The Câlnic is a left tributary of the river Gilort in Romania. It discharges into the Gilort in Albeni.

References

Rivers of Romania
Rivers of Gorj County